Abbeytown, also known as Holme Abbey, is a village and civil parish in the Allerdale borough of Cumbria, England.

The name Abbeytown dates to the mid-17th century (The Towne of the Abbey, Abbey Towne; Abbeytown from mid-18th century) and is named after the Holmcultram Abbey founded in the 12th century.

The population of the civil parish as of the 2011 census was 819.  It is located five-and-a-half miles south-east of Silloth, and six-and-a-half miles north-west of Wigton. The civil parish borders Holme Low to the north, Holme East Waver and Dundraw to the east, Bromfield to the south, and Holme St Cuthbert to the west. The county town of Carlisle is eighteen miles to the north-east. Other nearby settlements include Foulsyke, Highlaws, Kelsick, Mawbray, Pelutho, and Wheyrigg. The B5302 road runs through the village.

Historically a part of Cumberland, Abbeytown was built around the former Cistercian Holmcultram Abbey, the nave of the church of which now serves the parish as St Mary's Church. On 9 June 2006 the church was set alight in an arson attack which devastated its roof parts of which had been in situ since it was erected 900 years ago. The church has since been restored, and fully reopened in September 2015.

The Village also has a recreational field, which regularly hosts football matches from around the Allerdale district. The recreational field was constructed in 2012, with the demolition of the former standing structural foundation making way for a new field. A designated area within this field houses the children's play park.
As of 2015 Abbeytown Archers have set up their club at the recreational field, and outdoor shooting takes place on Monday evenings, with indoor shooting held in the Holm Cultram C of E school, also on Mondays.
The village is located on the main Wigton to Silloth road and has a small range of local amenities including a pub, post office and a shop.

Many buildings in the village date from the medieval period, especially those associated with the former abbey. Others are  Victorian, when much of the village was concerned with the railway line to Silloth, and, more recently, a large number of houses were built at "Friars Garth".

The village is located on the edge of the Solway Coast Area of Outstanding Natural Beauty and the Cumbria Coastal Way passes through the village.

Governance
Abbeytown is part of the parliamentary constituency of Workington. In the December 2019 general election, the Tory candidate for Workington, Mark Jenkinson, was elected the MP, overturning a 9.4 per cent Labour majority from the 2017 election to eject shadow environment secretary Sue Hayman by a margin of 4,136 votes. Until the December 2019 general election The Labour Party has won the seat in the constituency in every general election since 1979.The Conservative Party has only been elected once in Workington since World War II, at the 1976 by-election.

Before Brexit, it was in the North West England European Parliamentary Constituency.

Nuclear disposal site
In June 2012, it became clear that the Solway Plain between Silloth, Abbeytown and Westnewton has been identified as a potential site for a Geological Disposal Facility for the UK's high level nuclear waste. Two other sites have also been identified – Eskdale and Ennerdale – both of these are within the Lake District National Park. The Solway Plain wasn't named by the Managing Radioactive Waste Safely (MRWS) Partnership, rather they referred to the 'Low permeability sedimentary rocks associated with the Mercia Mudstone Group (MMG)'.  This was in (publicly available) document 285 of the West Cumbria MRWS in a report written by Dr Dearlove, the consultant geologist recruited by MRWS. In 2013, Cumbria County Council withdrew from the MRWS process. Though Allerdale Borough Council and Copeland Borough Council wished to proceed, the Department of Energy and Climate Change closed the site selection process in west Cumbria.

See also

Listed buildings in Holme Abbey

Sources and external links

 Cumbria County History Trust: Holme Abbey (nb: provisional research only – see Talk page)
 Holme Cultram Abbey pictures (before and after the fire)
 British History Online: The Register and Records of Holm Cultram: the full text of the cartulary and other records of the abbey.

References

Villages in Cumbria
Civil parishes in Cumbria